Psednos carolinae is a species of snailfish only known from a single male specimen collected in mid-Indian Ocean in 1964.

This fish, 39 mm standard length, has a slender body and large head with the mouth angled upwards 90°. It can be distinguished from all other Psednos species by the low number of vertebrae (38).

References

Liparidae
Taxa named by Daniel L. Stein 
Fish described in 2005